The 1991 Humboldt State Lumberjacks football team represented Humboldt State University during the 1991 NCAA Division II football season. Humboldt State competed in the Northern California Athletic Conference in 1991.

The 1991 Lumberjacks were led by first-year head coach Fred Whitmire. They played home games at the Redwood Bowl in Arcata, California. Humboldt State finished with a record of six wins and five losses (6–5, 2–3 NCAC). The Lumberjacks were outscored by their opponents 223–247 for the season.

Schedule

Team players in the NFL
The following Humboldt State players were selected in the 1992 NFL Draft.

Notes

References

Humboldt State
Humboldt State Lumberjacks football seasons
Humboldt State Lumberjacks football